Negur Rural District is a rural district (dehestan) in Dashtiari County, Sistan and Baluchestan province, Iran. At the 2006 census, its population was 17,425, in 3,254 families.  The rural district has 50 villages.

References 

Rural Districts of Sistan and Baluchestan Province
Chabahar County